Yarmouth, officially named the Municipality of the District of Yarmouth, is a district municipality in Yarmouth County, Nova Scotia, Canada. Statistics Canada classifies the district municipality as a municipal district.

The district municipality forms the western part of Yarmouth County. It is one of three municipal units in the county, the other two being the Town of Yarmouth and the Municipality of the District of Argyle.

Demographics 

Education: 
No certificate, diploma or degree: 35.32% 
High school certificate: 18.16% 
Apprenticeship or trade certificate or diploma: 13.43% 
Community college, CEGEP or other non-university certificate or diploma: 20.06% 
University certificate or diploma: 12.96%

Unemployment rate: 
10.9%

Average house value: 
$141,461

Communities 
Communities include:

See also
 List of municipalities in Nova Scotia

References

External links

Communities in Yarmouth County
District municipalities in Nova Scotia